Alexis Caswell (January 29, 1799 – January 8, 1877) was an American educator, born in Taunton, Massachusetts. He graduated Brown University in 1822, and entered the Baptist ministry.

Career
Caswell was professor of mathematics and natural philosophy at Brown University from 1828 to 1850, and of mathematics and astronomy from 1850 to 1864. Professor Caswell was president of Brown University from 1868 to 1872. He was one of the founders of the American Association for the Advancement of Science and served as its President in 1857.

Besides several papers on meteorology in the Reports of the Smithsonian Institution, he wrote The Life of Francis Wayland,  a Textbook on Astronomy, and a Memorial of John Barstow (1864).

Family
Caswell was the son of Samuel (1760-1851) and Polly Foster Seaver Caswell (1768-1818). Through his father, he is a direct descendant of Peregrine White, the first baby boy born aboard the Mayflower while it was anchored at the Massachusetts harbor.

On May 17, 1830, Caswell married Esther Lois Thompson (September 1, 1802 – June 25, 1850) of Providence, the daughter of Edward Kinnicutt Thompson and his wife, Sarah Kuhn Swope/Swoope Thompson. She was a 3rd great-granddaughter of Roger Kinnicutt, who was born in England and emigrated to America around 1635. Her distant cousins include G. Hermann Kinnicutt and Chevy Chase. 
They had at least six children:
 Sarah Swope Caswell (1831-1903), who married James Burrill Angell
 Mary Thompson Caswell (1832-1832)
 Edward Thompson Caswell (1833-1887)
 Alexis Caswell Jr. (1835-1837)
 Joseph Thompson Caswell (1838-1838)
 Joseph Thompson Caswell II (1840-1913)

After Esther's death, Caswell married Elizabeth Brown Edmands (1817-1880) in 1855.

His notable descendants include James Rowland Angell, Alexis C. Angell, Robert Cooley Angell, and Constance Green.

Bibliography

References

External links
 
 Biographical memoir of Alexic Caswell by Lovering
National Academy of Sciences Biographical Memoir

1799 births
1877 deaths
19th-century American mathematicians
American astronomers
American biographers
American male biographers
American educational theorists
American textbook writers
Brown University alumni
Brown University faculty
Baptists from Massachusetts
People from Taunton, Massachusetts
Presidents of Brown University
19th-century American male writers
19th-century Baptist ministers from the United States
Burials at North Burying Ground (Providence)